Basilar invagination is invagination (infolding) of the base of the skull that occurs when the top of the C2 vertebra migrates upward. It can cause narrowing of the foramen magnum (the opening in the skull where the spinal cord passes through to the brain). It also may press on the lower brainstem.

This is similar to Chiari malformation. That, however, is usually present at birth.

Signs and symptoms
Symptoms vary depending on whether the spinal cord, brain stem, nerves, or blood supply is affected by the pressure.

Symptoms become apparent when the neck is bent. They include:
 Posterior head pain
 Neck weakness
 Periods  of confusion
 Dysphagia or Dysarthria (difficulty swallowing or talking due to loss of muscle control)
 Dizziness
 Loss of sensation
 Cranial nerve disturbance
 Loss of the ability to know how joints are positioned
 Lhermitte's sign ('electric shock sensation' down the spine and/or to the extremities when the neck is flexed forward)
 Weakness of the arms and legs
 Orthostatic hypotension
 Patients will go into a pool and notice that below their belly button the water is not as cold as it is above.

Complications from this can include hydrocephalus, pseudotumor cerebri or syringomyelia because it blocks the flow of fluid around the brain and spinal cord.

Causes
Basilar invagination can be present at birth. If the condition develops after birth, it is usually the result of injury or diseases. If due to injury, about half the time it is caused by vehicle or bicycle accidents; 25% of the time by falls and 10% of the time by recreational activities such as diving accidents.

It also occurs in patients with bone diseases, such as osteomalacia, rheumatoid arthritis, Paget's disease, Ehlers–Danlos syndrome, Marfan syndrome, and osteogenesis imperfecta.

Diagnosis

A doctor will base his or her diagnosis on the symptoms the patient has and the results of tests, including:
 An X-ray
 Magnetic resonance imaging (MRI), which usually provides the most information
 Computed tomography (CT) scan

Treatment
If there are no neurological symptoms (such as difficulties moving, loss of sensation, confusion, etc.) and there is no evidence of pressure on the spinal cord, a conservative approach may be taken such as:
 Medications, such as aspirin, without corticosteroids to relieve inflammation
 Cervical traction, in which the neck is pulled along its length, thus relieving pressure on the spinal cord
 Using a neck collar or cervical-thoracic suit

If there is pressure on the spinal cord or life-threatening symptoms are present, surgery is recommended.

See also
 Chiari malformation
 Syringomyelia
 Hydrocephalus
 Rheumatoid arthritis
 Ehlers–Danlos syndrome
 Marfan syndrome
 Dysautonomia

References

External links 

Neurological disorders